Surat Sukha (born July 27, 1982) is a Thai retired professional footballer who played as a defensive midfielder.

Personal life
Surat's twin older brother Suree was also a footballer who played as a right-back or defender.

Club career

Chonburi

In Chonburi Surat played as a defender and as a midfielder. He helped his team win the 2007 Thailand Premier League.

Melbourne Victory

Thailand international recruited from Chonburi FC in Thailand. Surat Sukha joined Melbourne Victory following a successful stint with Chonburi, where he was part of the Thai club's AFC Champions League 2008 and AFC Cup 2009 campaigns. Sukha made his international debut for Thailand in 2008 and joined Melbourne Victory for two years in 2009.

Surat joined 2-time A-League champions, Melbourne Victory, for a transfer fee of ฿1.5million (A$57,700) on 14 May 2009 on a 2-year deal worth A$140,000 "I am very proud, happy and excited to be the first player (from south-east Asia) to play in the A-League." he said.

He made his first appearance for his new club substituting in the 78th minute of the game on 15 August 2009 and made his first line-up at Melbourne Victory in a 1-0 win over North Queensland Fury on 20 August 2009.

Melbourne Victory has secured Surat for an additional year after he extended his contract with the club until 2012.

Buriram United

In July 2011 he was released by Melbourne, after the club had agreed to an unknown transfer fee for Thailand Premier League club Buriram PEA. It was also claimed that Sukha's family was not happy living in Australia, and this influenced his decision to leave the Victory. It was reported that he gets 300,000 baht per month at Buriram. Surat played for Buriram in the 2012 AFC Champions League. He also played in the 2013 AFC Champions League for Buriram. Surat won the 2013 Thai Premier League with his team.

International career
On the back of performing extremely well in the Thai Premier League with Chonburi, Surat was called up to the full national side in coach Peter Reid's first squad announcement, He was called up with 35 other players to the 2008 T&T Cup hosted by Vietnam.

Style of play

He was a defensive midfielder who could also play as a defender.

References

External links

Surat Sukha  profile at melbourne Victory.com
Thai-riffic Sukha forging new path at fifa.com

1982 births
Living people
Surat Sukha
Surat Sukha
Twin sportspeople
Surat Sukha
Association football midfielders
Surat Sukha
Surat Sukha
Melbourne Victory FC players
Surat Sukha
Surat Sukha
Surat Sukha
A-League Men players
Thai expatriate footballers
Thai expatriate sportspeople in Australia
Expatriate soccer players in Australia
Surat Sukha
Southeast Asian Games medalists in football
Surat Sukha
Competitors at the 2003 Southeast Asian Games